Nepo Eti Laulala (born 6 November 1991) is a New Zealand rugby union footballer who plays as a Tighthead Prop for Counties Manukau Steelers in the Mitre 10 Cup, the Blues in Super Rugby and for the national All Blacks, having made his international debut in 2015. He was a member of New Zealand's 2019 Rugby World Cup squad and has been a regular starter for New Zealand since 2017. Laulala has yet to score any points for New Zealand in his international career.

Early life
Laulala was born in Samoa and educated at Auckland's Mount Albert Grammar School and later at Wesley College. After showing impressive form for the Wesley College 1st XV, was enticed to Christchurch to join the Canterbury Academy. Laulala played 1st XV rugby with several future professional sportsmen, including former All Blacks, Malakai Fekitoa, Charles Piutau and Augustine Pulu, as well as his current All Black teammate, Karl Tu'inukuafe.

Laulala's brothers, Casey Laulala and Luteru Laulala have also had careers in professional rugby. Casey is also a former All Black that last played international rugby in 2006. The Laulala brothers are one of 57 sets of brothers to become All Blacks.

Playing career

Early career
Laulala made his ITM cup debut in 2011 in a Ranfurly Shield defence against North Otago. His performances for his province have seen him named in the Crusaders squad for the 2013 Super Rugby season.

Laulala made his Super Rugby debut for the Crusaders in 2013 against the Chiefs. Laulala announced in 2015 that the Chiefs would become his new team in 2016.

Laulala was selected as part of the 41-man wider training squad for the 2015 All Blacks squad. Laulala made his debut for New Zealand in the first test match of the year against Manu Samoa in Apia on 8 July, replacing Owen Franks off the bench in the 57th minute, with the All Blacks going on to win against Manu Samoa by 25–16. He played another 3 tests off the bench for the All Blacks in 2015 but narrowly missed out on selection for the 2015 Rugby World Cup.

Laulala had a serious knee injury at the start of the 2016 season, so did not play for the Chiefs, or the All Blacks for the whole of 2016, with All Black teammates Nehe Milner-Skudder, Charlie Ngatai and James Broadhurst, missing the 2016 All Black season too.

2017-2018
Laulala returned to Super Rugby in 2017 and started in most games for the Chiefs that year, including a 64-minute performance in the game against the touring British and Irish Lions on 20 June 2017, which the Chiefs lost 34–6.

Due to a run of injuries, Laulala was not selected for the All Blacks again until the 2017 Rugby Championship. He was a last-minute selection for the second Bledisloe Cup test against Australia (a 35–29 win to New Zealand), after 95-test veteran Owen Franks tore his Achilles tendon the day before the match. Laulala's 61-minute performance was widely acclaimed after winning several opposing scrums for the All Blacks. Laulala became a regular starter for New Zealand in Franks' absence, and started in every remaining test of the year following Franks' injury, making a total of nine test appearances for the All Blacks in 2017.

Laulala fractured his forearm in a 27–21 win against the Blues in round three of the 2018 Super Rugby season. Laulala was expected to be out of professional rugby for 8–12 weeks, but has still not recovered from injury. Laulala failed to make the field for the All Blacks during the 2018 mid-year tests and was not selected due to injury, much like his injured Chiefs teammate Kane Hames. Continued delays in Laulala's recovery also saw him miss the 2018 Rugby Championship, with another one of his Chiefs teammates, Angus Ta'avao, making his debut for the All Blacks while Laulala was out injured.

In the dying stages of the 2018 Mitre 10 Cup, he finally made a return from his broken arm, for Counties Manukau. Although Counties Manukau failed to make the playoffs, Laulala did enough to convince All Black Head Coach, Steve Hansen, to re-select him. Laulala was named in the extended 51-man squad for the 2018 end-of-year tour and was subsequently given a spot on the bench for the third Bledisloe Cup test against Australia's Wallabies for 2018, displacing Ofa Tu'ungafasi from the match-day 23. Laulala replaced Owen Franks in the 52nd minute against the Wallabies, completing his comeback to international rugby. The All Blacks beat the Wallabies, 37–20.

A strong performance against Australia saw Laulala replace Franks in two crucial tests during the tour, against England and Ireland, the latter of whom defeated New Zealand for only the second time in history, with the All Blacks losing 9–16. Laulala was out-performed by his opposites, Cian Healy and Jack McGrath, but still performed fine. After a long injury-plagued year, Laulala earned a start for the final test of the tour, which was only his fourth test of 2018. The final test on tour took place at Stadio Olimpico at Rome in Italy. The All Blacks finished the year off with a 66–3 win over Italy. Laulala contributed a 54-minute performance towards the win against Italy and was replaced by Angus Ta'avao after a good game.

2019
With All Black teammate, Angus Ta'avao, also present in the Chiefs' squad for the 2019 Super Rugby season, Laulala started many matches across the season, although he was benched for their quarter-final, which was a 16–21 loss to the Buenos Aires-based Jaguares.

After a poor performance from Owen Franks in New Zealand's record 26–47 defeat at the hands of Australia in Perth, Laulala reclaimed a place in the starting lineup for New Zealand's second Bledisloe Cup test against Australia for 2019, which ended as a 36–0 victory.

On 28 August, All Blacks Head Coach, Steve Hansen named Laulala as one of 31 players in New Zealand's squad for the 2019 Rugby World Cup.
 With Owen Franks missing out on the squad entirely, the selection of Laulala and Angus Ta'avao received widespread news coverage. Franks claimed that Laulala and Ta'avao "deserve their places in the World Cup squad".

Laulala played in all of New Zealand's tests at the 2019 Rugby World Cup, starting in five and as a substitute against Canada. The All Blacks finished third place in the competition, beating Wales in the Bronze Final after a 7–19 loss to England during the semi-finals.

2020
On 22 October 2020, it was confirmed that Laulala would leave the Chiefs to join Auckland based Blues prior to the 2021 Super Rugby season.

References

External links 
Nepo Laulala itsrugby.co.uk Player Statistics

1991 births
New Zealand rugby union players
Canterbury rugby union players
Crusaders (rugby union) players
Rugby union props
Samoan emigrants to New Zealand
Living people
Chiefs (rugby union) players
Counties Manukau rugby union players
People educated at Mount Albert Grammar School
People educated at Wesley College, Auckland
New Zealand international rugby union players
Blues (Super Rugby) players